Selçuk Baştürk (born 29 April 1986 in Üsküdar, İstanbul) is a Turkish professional footballer who plays as a defender for Kozanspor.
He started his career with Fenerbahçe A2 and he started his professional career with Mersin Büyükşehir Belediyespor and also played for Turgutluspor.

His contract will end on 31 May 2011 by his profile in Turkey Football Federation.

References

External links
TFF.org profile

1986 births
Living people
People from Üsküdar
Turkish footballers
Fenerbahçe S.K. footballers
Turgutluspor footballers
Balıkesirspor footballers
Footballers from Istanbul
Association football defenders